The Iraq Awakening and Independents National Alliance (List 239) is an Iraqi political coalition formed to contest the 2009 Al Anbar governorate election. It obtained 8 out of 29 seats - the highest of any party list.

The party was formed out of the Awakening movements - Sunni tribal militias armed and financed by the United States Army to fight al-Qaeda in Iraq. The Alliance was led by Sheikh Ahmed Abu Risha, Sheikh Amir Ali al-Sulaiman and Sheikh Hameed al-Hayyes. Abu Risha is the brother of Abdul Sattar Abu Risha who headed the Anbar Salvation Council, the first Awakening Movement to receive American backing.

External links 
 Official Website

References 

Political parties in Iraq